John McAuley Palmer (September 13, 1817September 25, 1900) was an Illinois resident, an American Civil War general who fought for the Union, the 15th governor of Illinois, and presidential candidate of the National Democratic Party in the 1896 election on a platform to defend the gold standard, free trade, and limited government.

Palmer switched political parties throughout his life, starting out a Democrat. He became in turn an anti-Nebraska Democrat (an anti-slavery opponent of the Kansas-Nebraska Act), a Republican, a Liberal Republican, returned to being a Democrat, then ended as a Bourbon Democrat. He said, "I had my own views. I was not a slave of any party," and added, "I thought for myself and [have] spoken my own words on all occasions."

Early life and career
Born at Eagle Creek in Scott County, Kentucky, Palmer's family in 1831 moved to Alton, Illinois. They were very poor, but he later worked his way through college. In 1839, he was admitted to the bar in that state. Palmer married Malinda Ann Neely in 1842 and had ten children with her. His early careers included being a lawyer, school teacher, coopering, and selling clocks.

Palmer was a member of the state constitutional convention of 1848. Between 1852 and 1855, he was a Democratic member of the Illinois Senate, but joined the Republican party upon its organization and became one of its leaders in Illinois.

He presided over the 1856 Illinois Republican Convention in Bloomington that founded the party in his home state. In 1859 he was the Republican candidate in a special election to a vacancy in the 36th Congress caused by the death of Thomas L. Harris, but he was defeated by John A. McClernand. He later became a Republican presidential elector in 1860, and was one of the leading people who got his friend Abraham Lincoln nominated for the presidency at the national convention in Chicago.

In 1861, he was appointed by Lincoln to be a delegate to the peace convention in Washington.  It failed when no compromise could be reached.

Civil War
During the American Civil War, Palmer served in the Union army, rising from the rank of colonel to that of major general in the volunteer service. He enlisted in 1861 and was commissioned Colonel of the 14th Illinois Infantry, serving under his friend John C. Fremont in an expedition to Springfield, Missouri, to put down the rebellion in that state. On December 20, 1861, he was promoted to brigadier general and assigned command of a brigade under John Pope.

Palmer took part in the capture of New Madrid and Island No. 10, commanding a division in the latter campaign. Taken ill in the field, he returned home to recuperate and raised a new regiment, the 122nd Illinois Infantry.  Taking the field again in September, he was assigned by William S. Rosecrans to command the first division of the Army of the Mississippi in Alabama and Tennessee. On November 29, 1862, he was promoted to major general of volunteers, and was conspicuous in the Battle of Stones River, where his division held an important position within the Union lines.

Palmer effectively led his troops during the Battle of Chickamauga in September 1863. He commanded the XIV Corps of the Army of the Cumberland during the Chattanooga Campaign (November 23–November 25, 1863), and served under George Henry Thomas in the Atlanta Campaign. Palmer's corps was a part of William T. Sherman's movement at the Railroads at East Point, in early August 1864. His corps was placed under the command of Major General John M. Schofield and ordered to cross North Utoy Creek. He questioned his orders, as he outranked Schofield as a Major General. A delay ensued while Sherman researched the question of rank and he ruled in favor of the 33-year-old, Schofield, commander of the Army of Ohio. After the main assault by the XIV and XXIII Corps in which one of his Soldiers, PVT Samual Grimshaw received the Medal of Honor, Palmer resigned in protest on the evening of August 6, 1864 and Brigadier General Johnson assumed command of the XIV Corps. Later Major General Jefferson C. Davis assumed command of the Corps. This is the only example of a resignation in the middle of an operation during the history of the United States. He returned home and awaited orders from the War Department. In early 1865, he was reassigned to command all Federal forces in Kentucky, helping to assert Federal control over the state for the next three years.
  
As Kentucky's military governor, Palmer established such control by two methods: waging a hard war against guerrillas and achieving the end of slavery in a state not bound by the Emancipation Proclamation. As late as May 1865, Palmer made clear his position on hard war after Kentucky irregulars still in the field had threatened him about summary punishment for captured partisans—"if you treat them as prisoners of war we will respect the same towards your soldiers if not we never can."  Palmer ordered that guerrillas would not be allowed to surrender.  "[N]o commission, real or forged, shall save [them]," he ordered, "all will be driven out or punished accordingly ... such men [will] be exterminated."  Palmer, one of the organizers of the Republican Party in Illinois, was an avowed abolitionist who had received his assignment from his friend the president specifically to implement military policies to end slavery in the state.  (When Lincoln offered the assignment in Kentucky to Palmer, then without a command, the general claimed the president directed him firmly: "Go to Kentucky, keep your temper, do as you please, and I will sustain you.")  Palmer in fact needed little convincing, believing "that all that was left of slavery [in Kentucky] was its mischiefs" and, as he related, he was "determined to 'drive the last nail in the coffin' of the 'institution' even if it cost me the command of the department."  (Indeed, to his wife he opined in 1865 that "if [I] had been asked five or ten years ago what honor I would ask as the highest which could be confer[r]ed upon me I would have said let me destroy slavery in Kentucky.")  On March 20, at one of Louisville's Methodist churches, he announced as much.

In the next few months, with an assiduousness that belied the initial impression he gave the legislature that he intended to placate the state's loyal white populace, Palmer carried out Lincoln's directive.  Not only did he actively enlist all able-bodied black men at an unprecedented rate — often with the assistance of all-black recruiting squads, and despite the legislature's strident objection to the continued presence of black troops in the state — he sustained martial law in the state in order to override the state's civil courts and governments because of their obvious unwillingness to assume "their clear and positive duty to protect the people from forcible wrongs, whether inflicted under the forms of law or otherwise."  He legitimated slave marriages to protect the wives and children of enlisted men (in part a response to the Camp Nelson embarrassment), established refugee camps, fended off efforts by various municipal governments to expel fugitive slaves and free blacks alike and deny them the opportunity to find employment, released slaves from jails and workhouses, ordered that no bondman should be forced into service as substitutes, and issued tens of thousands of travel passes enabling African Americans to move freely within and without the state in search of employment.  Called by African Americans "free passes" (and by white Kentuckians "Palmer passes") they were both agent and symbol of the delayed yet inevitable death of slavery in the state.  At an African American Fourth of July celebration at Louisville's camp—one that followed a parade through the city streets, including some fifteen hundred armed black and white soldiers and band—Palmer, arriving in a gilded circus chariot, told an estimated twenty thousand attendees, most of whom he had already been assured believed the general was there to declare them free (and who he claimed later he set out to inform otherwise), "My countrymen, you are free, and while I command in this department the military forces of the United States will defend your right to freedom."  That one of its circuit courts was soon to strike down Congress's act of March 3, 1865, liberating black soldiers' dependents — some 72,045 individuals, or by one USCT officer's estimate, "[t]wo and one half persons freed, for each Colored Soldier enlisted in the State of Kentucky" and two-thirds of the state's slaves—only fueled the general's intent to cure the state's white residents of "Negrophobia in its worst form."  "Slavery is dead in Kentucky," he said to his wife in October 1865, "and my Mission is accomplished."  He was soon met with an indictment by Louisville's grand jury for aiding fugitive slaves and a wave of lawsuits from dispossessed Kentucky slaveholders.

Postbellum career

In 1866, he resigned from the army and two years later was elected Governor of Illinois as a candidate of the Republican Party.  He succeeded fellow Republican, General Richard James Oglesby. He was succeeded in turn by Oglesby in 1873. In the presidential election of 1872, Governor Palmer received three electoral votes for vice president by electors who had voted for the Liberal Republican Party's vice presidential candidate B. Gratz Brown for president after the death of Horace Greeley. In the 1891 United States Senate election, he was elected to the U.S. Senate as a Democrat and served one term.

Mrs. Palmer Weber, the daughter of Senator Palmer, spent considerable time in Washington City during her father's senatorial term, where her beauty, grace and geniality made her very popular.

1892 presidential possibility

In 1892, Palmer was seriously considered as a candidate for the presidency. At first, Palmer was taken up as a "refuge" candidate. Some Chicago Democrats, who were not prepared to accept Cleveland, Hill, or Gorman, were to support Palmer until they could go to the winner. This in itself was a point gained by Palmer and he proceeded to utilize it at once.

In early February 1892, Palmer had a conference with Patrick A. Collins, a former Democratic Massachusetts Congressman. At this conference, the two Democrats concluded a treaty. The purpose of the treaty was to make Palmer the Democratic presidential candidate and Massachusetts Governor William Russell, Collins' political ally and personal friend, the vice presidential candidate. It was argued by Collins that Palmer, being a Western senator of Kentucky stock, would be acceptable to the Southern Democrats. The objection as to Palmer's age would be met by pointing out that Russell, the youngest of governors, would become president in the event of his death. Russell's nomination would command the support of New England Democrats.

Before the 1892 Democratic National Convention, Cook County Democrats held a convention and endorsed Senator Palmer for president. In the end, Palmer stood faithful to former president Grover Cleveland and worked to have him nominated.  Even though he supported Cleveland, many Illinois Democrats still supported him for president. Palmer was such a serious candidate that he had to go to the Democratic Convention in Chicago to discourage his own nomination.

But, under exceptional circumstances, he did run for president in 1896, rather than seeking reelection to the Senate.

Defending the gold standard

Palmer was the presidential candidate for the National Democratic Party in the 1896 election.  The National Democratic Party was a conservative splinter group opposed to the free-silver platform of the regular Democratic Party and its nominee, William Jennings Bryan. His running mate on this "Gold Democratic" ticket was Simon Bolivar Buckner, Sr., a former Confederate general and governor of Kentucky. The National Democratic Party ticket received the coveted endorsement of the New York Times.

The party arose out of a split in the Democratic Party due to the economic depression that occurred under Democratic president Grover Cleveland. At the 1896 presidential convention, one of Palmer's main Illinois rivals was Governor John Peter Altgeld, who succeeded in getting his own candidate, former Illinoisan William Jennings Bryan, nominated for the presidency. The currency issue dominated the campaign, blurring party lines. Eastern Democrats, unable to accept the party's free-silver platform and unwilling to support McKinley for his tariff views, created their own political party and nominated Palmer as their own candidate.

Palmer opposed free silver, which was a plan to place the value of silver to gold at a 16-to-1 ratio, and then to tie the U.S. dollar to that value.  Palmer noted that this plan ran contrary to the world market value of silver and gold, which was about 32 to 1.  But, with Altgeld and Bryan in control of the Democratic convention, free silver won the day. Palmer believed it would have ruined the American economy, and he ran for president for a third party that was a breakaway group of Democrats.  An article in the libertarian The Independent Review argues that in waging this quixotic campaign, he was a key figure in the "last stand" of classical liberalism as a political movement in the 19th century.

Palmer and the other founders were disenchanted Democrats who viewed the party as a means to preserve the small-government ideals of Thomas Jefferson and Grover Cleveland, which they believed had been betrayed by Bryan. In its first official statement, the executive committee of the party declared, the Democrats had believed "in the ability of every individual, unassisted, if unfettered by law, to achieve his own happiness" and had upheld his "right and opportunity peaceably to pursue whatever course of conduct he would, provided such conduct deprived no other individual of the equal enjoyment of the same right and opportunity. [They] stood for freedom of speech, freedom of conscience, freedom of trade, and freedom of contract, all of which are implied by the century-old battle-cry of the Democratic party, 'Individual Liberty'" The party criticized both the inflationist policies of the Democrats and the protectionism of the Republicans.

Palmer's campaign platform was popular and he could have been a major factor in the election had he been younger, but few voters were willing to support a 79-year-old candidate. Although he could have made up for this with a youthful running mate, he instead chose 73-year-old Simon Bolivar Buckner, in part because it was thought that the idea of two former generals, one Union and one Confederate, teamed up would emphasize national unity and ease the still-lingering resentment in the South from the Civil War. The two displayed a good amount of energy for their age and embarked on a busy campaign schedule, but most supporters of the ideals of the National Democratic Party probably voted for McKinley because of his support of the gold standard. Palmer and Buckner received just over 1% of the vote.

Palmer died of a heart attack in Springfield, Illinois on September 25, 1900 and was interred in the City Cemetery in Carlinville, Illinois.

John M. Palmer Elementary School, located at 5051 North Kenneth Avenue on the northwest side of Chicago was named in his honor.

See also

List of American Civil War generals (Union)

References

Further reading 
 
 
 Beito, David T., and Linda Royster Beito. "Gold Democrats and the decline of classical liberalism, 1896–1900." The Independent Review 4.4 (2000): 555-575.
 The Personal Recollections of John M. Palmer: The Story of an Earnest Life, published posthumously in 1901.
 Mostly Good and Competent Men, Second Edition, by Robert H. Howard, revised and updated by Peggy Boyer Long and Mike Lawrence in 1998.
 

|-

|-

|-

|-

1817 births
1900 deaths
19th-century American lawyers
American abolitionists
Candidates in the 1896 United States presidential election
Democratic Party United States senators from Illinois
Governors of Illinois
Illinois Democrats
Illinois Free Soilers
Illinois lawyers
Illinois Republicans
Illinois state senators
Liberal Republican Party United States senators
National Democratic Party (United States) politicians
People from Macoupin County, Illinois
People from Scott County, Kentucky
People of Illinois in the American Civil War
Politicians from Springfield, Illinois
Republican Party governors of Illinois
Union Army generals
Bourbon Democrats